Andreas Pistiolis (6 July 1978; Athens, Greece), Greek basketball coach.  He is the current head coach of Galatasaray Nef of the Turkish BSL.

Coaching career
Andreas Pistiolis, started his coaching career in the Panathinaikos youth team between 1996–2005, started to work as an assistant coach in the Panathinaikos in 2005. During his 7 seasons there, he was the assistant of Serbian coach Željko Obradović.

Pistiolis moved to Banvit as an assistant of Dimitris Itoudis in the 2013–2014 season, after one season there, he signed with CSKA Moscow by following Itoudis, and he was worked as the first assistant coach of CSKA Moscow for 8 seasons, between 2014–2022.

Galatasaray
On 19 March 2022, he became the head coach of Galatasaray Nef of the Turkish BSL. On 26 November 2022, it was announced that the contract with Galatasaray Nef was extended until 2025.

References

External links
Andreas Pistiolis Eurobasket Profile

Living people
1978 births
Galatasaray S.K. (men's basketball) coaches
Greek basketball coaches
Sportspeople from Athens